The Game is an album by Oi! band Sham 69, released in 1980 (see 1980 in music). The album was recorded in the French Alps with overdubbing and mixing completed at Rock City Studios, Shepperton.

Track listing
All songs by Jimmy Pursey and Dave Parsons unless noted
 "The Game" – 3:00
 "Human Zoo" – 2:50
 "Lord of the Flies" (Dave Tregunna) - 3:09
 "Give a Dog a Bone" (Rick Goldstein, Parsons, Pursey, Tregunna) - 3:02
 "In and Out" – 2:59
 "Tell the Children" – 3:39
 "Spray It on the Wall" (Goldstein, Tregunna) - 2:29
 "Dead or Alive" – 2:53
 "Simon" (Parsons) - 2:52
 "Déjà Vu" – 3:25
 "Poor Cow" – 3:23
 "Run Wild Run Free" – 2:47
CD reissue bonus tracks
 "Jack" – 3:28
 "Unite and Win" – 3:41
 "I'm a Man, I'm a Boy" – 1:54
 "Daytripper" (John Lennon, Paul McCartney) - 3:42

Personnel
Sham 69
Jimmy Pursey – vocals, producer, design, cover design, liner notes
Dave Guy Parsons – guitar
Dave Tregunna – bass, liner notes
Ricky Goldstein- drums
with:
Nik Turner - saxophone on "Tell the Children"
Royal School of Music - backing vocals on "Lord of the Flies"
Technical
Pete Wilson – keyboards, producer, engineer
Brian Burrows – remixing, sleeve remix
Alwyn Clayden – package design
Jo Mirowski – art direction
Rob O'Connor – artwork
Bob Smithers – illustrations
Shane Baldwin – liner notes
Barry Plummer – photography

References

1980 albums
Sham 69 albums
Polydor Records albums